CWT Kaleva Travel is the largest travel management company in Finland. It is a division of CWT, owned by Carlson, which acquired the company in February 2011.

The company also operates in Estonia, Latvia, Lithuania, and Romania.

The origins of the company date to 1935.

References

External links
 

Carlson (company)
Travel agencies
Travel and holiday companies of Finland